Schrenkiella may refer to:
 Schrenkiella (brachiopod), a genus of brachiopods in the family Monticuliferidae
 Schrenkiella (plant), a genus of plants in the family Brassicaceae